The Coming Storm is the fifth studio album by British electronic group Freestylers. The album was released on 10 June 2013, almost seven years after their last. It is their first full-length release through the Black Hole Recordings subsidiary Rub-A-Duck. It is also one of their first projects with Chris Bishop from Stereo:Type, the new addition to their production team.

Background and release
Throughout the album, the Freestylers showcase their ever-eclectic style and renegade approach to production focusing on everything in the bass music spectrum, including drum and bass, dubstep, speed garage and acid house, while also not shying away from their well-known hip hop/breakbeat style. The album features collaborations with various artists such as Stereo:Type, Wizard (a frequent collaborator with DJ Deekline), SirReal, Laura Steel, Irwin Sparkes, Takura Tendayi, Synikall and hiphouse legend Fast Eddie.

The first two singles that the Freestylers released after signing to the Rub-A-Duck label, "Frozen", recorded with Joshua Steele (a.k.a. Flux Pavilion), and "Over You", which featured Ami Carmine, were included in the album as bonus tracks.

Through their SoundCloud page, the track "Calling Me Home" (featuring D.V.) was released as a free download to promote the release of the album and its title single. Later, a remix competition for "The Coming Storm" was held to celebrate the launch of the new album at Subsound, Liverpool. They have also released their own VIP mix of the track.

Track listing

Notes
 Track 7 "You and What Army" features uncredited vocals by Andrea Martin

Credits and personnel

Credits adapted from AllMusic

Freestylers
 Matt Cantor, Aston Harvey - all instruments, production
 Chris Bishop - engineering

Technical and other personnel
 Hugo de Graaf – artwork, design
 Jammy Jay – cut, scratching
 Naweed – mastering

Additional musicians
 Marcel Atteen – vocals, writer (9)
 E.L. Isselt – writer (13)
 Valerie Malcolm – vocals, writer (8)
 A. Martin – writer (7)
 M.A. Parkinson – writer (13)
 Dave Penning – vocals, writer (1)
 Lee Potter – writer (12)
 Amy Richardson – writer (12)
 Edwin Smith – vocals, writer (10)
 Irwin Sparkes – vocals, writer (2, 11)
 Laura Steel – vocals, writer (3, 6)
 Takura Tendayi – vocals, writer (4)
 Jerome Thompson – vocals, writer (1)

 Stereo:Type – co-producer (1, 4)
 Synikall – vocals (5)
 Wizard – co-producer (9)
 Them&Us – vocals (12)
 Maikal X – vocals (13)
 Ed Solo – remixer, additional production (15)
 Sound Avtar – remixer, additional production (16)
 Joshua Steele – vocals, writer, co-producer (17)
 Ami Carmine – vocals (18)

Release history

External links

References

2013 albums
Black Hole Recordings albums
Freestylers albums